Joseph Roger Eugene Pichette (DFC) (August 14, 1921 – November 21, 2002) was a Canadian politician. Born in Chandler, Quebec, he attended school in Campbellton, New Brunswick where he lived for most of his life. He served with the Royal Canadian Air Force during World War II. He rose to the level of Flight Lieutenant and was awarded the Distinguished Flying Cross.

In 1943 Roger Pichette married Florence Olscamp (1923–2002) of Ste-Anne de Restigouche (Listuguj Mi'gmaq First Nation), Quebec. The couple had a son and three daughters.

Pichette was first elected to the Legislative Assembly of New Brunswick as the Progressive Conservative Party member for the Restigouche riding in the 1952 Provincial election. New premier Hugh John Flemming appointed him Minister of Industry and Development on October 8, 1952. Reelected in 1956, Pichette remained Minister until July 12, 1960 when his party was defeated in the 1960 New Brunswick general election.

In the 1979 Canadian federal election, Pichette was the unsuccessful Progressive Conservative Party of Canada's candidate in the federal riding of Restigouche.

Roger Pichette died in Moncton, New Brunswick in 2002 at age eighty-one. His wife died less than two months later. They are buried in Campbellton, New Brunswick.

References
 Magocsi, Paul Robert. Encyclopedia of Canada's Peoples (1999) University of Toronto Press 
 Legislative Assembly of New Brunswick tribute to Roger Pichette (PDF file)

1921 births
2002 deaths
Canadian military personnel of World War II
Recipients of the Distinguished Flying Cross (United Kingdom)
Businesspeople from New Brunswick
Progressive Conservative Party of New Brunswick MLAs
Members of the Executive Council of New Brunswick
New Brunswick candidates for Member of Parliament
French Quebecers
People from Campbellton, New Brunswick
People from Gaspésie–Îles-de-la-Madeleine